Micraphe is a monotypic genus of moths in the family Limacodidae. It contains a single species, M. lateritia, the rosy slug.

Distribution 
Micraphe lateritia occurs in Central and Southern Africa.

References 

Moths described in 1896
Monotypic moth genera